Opportunity Knocks is a British television and radio talent show originally hosted by Hughie Green, with a late-1980s revival hosted by Bob Monkhouse, and later by previous winner Les Dawson. From its origin on BBC Radio in 1949 the show provided a platform to fame for acts such as Spike Milligan and Frankie Vaughan. One of the most popular shows on British television, in the 1960s and 1970s it had a weekly audience of 20 million viewers.

The original radio version started on the BBC Light Programme, where it ran from 18 February to 29 September 1949, but moved to Radio Luxembourg in the 1950s. It was shown on ITV from 20 June 1956 to 29 August 1956, produced by Associated Rediffusion. A second run commenced on 11 July 1964 and lasted until 20 March 1978, produced first by ABC and then by Thames. During this period Bob Sharples was musical director. Green presented a single episode of Opportunity Knocks for RTÉ in 1979. It was revived by the BBC from 21 March 1987 to 2 June 1990, hosted initially by Monkhouse from 1987 to 1989 (under the title Bob Says Opportunity Knocks!) and subsequently by Dawson in 1990. Kiki Dee's hit single "Star" became the theme song for the revived BBC series.

Voting system
Unlike its rival New Faces, the winning acts on Opportunity Knocks were decided not by a panel of experts but by the viewing public.  In the ITV version this took the form of a postal vote, the winner of which was announced the following week.  The BBC revival was notable for being the first TV show to decide its winner using the now-standard method of a telephone vote. In both versions the studio audience reaction to each act was measured by a clap-o-meter, but this did not count towards the final result.

The programme was recorded the Friday before transmission, so votes had to be in by Thursday. They also, according to host Hughie Green, largely to ensure fairness, had to be in "your own handwriting".

Although Opportunity Knocks did produce a number of talented acts, the method of putting the contest to a public vote did sometimes result in victories for novelty acts, in particular those involving children or animals. On one notorious occasion, the young Su Pollard was beaten into second place by a singing dog.

Famous alumni
Entertainers who appeared included Freddie Starr and the Delmonts, Su Pollard, Paul Daniels, Darren Day, Pete the Plate Spinning Dog, Los Caracas, later to become Middle of the Road, Mary Hopkin, Bonnie Langford, Les Dawson, Maureen Myers, Barry Cummings, Royston Vasey (later to find fame as Roy Chubby Brown), Little and Large, Bobby Crush, Berni Flint, Tony Holland (The Muscle Man), Millican & Nesbitt, Neil Reid, Peters and Lee, Lena Zavaroni, Frank Carson, Max Boyce, Pam Ayres, Juniper Green, Gerry Monroe, Debra Stephenson, Tammy Jones, Paper Lace, Barry and Paul Elliott and Tony Monopoly. Several winners of Opportunity Knocks (notably Tammy Jones, Champagne, Tony Monopoly) later attempted to represent the UK at the Eurovision Song Contest, taking part in the A Song for Europe competition. Lee Evans appeared in 1986 but was rejected and did not make it past the initial audition. Kaz Hawkins appeared in the 1980s' revival as a child.

Influence
Today, most of the elements of this show are visible on the ITV talent search Britain's Got Talent, which was created by record company executive Simon Cowell. The method of deciding a winner by telephone is used on that show and many other similar programmes around the world.

A reference to the show can be heard on the Beatles' first live performance of "Yesterday" at Blackpool Night Out. George Harrison introduces the song, saying "For Paul McCartney of Liverpool, opportunity knocks!". This version appears on Anthology 2.

Transmissions

BBC Light Programme

ITV

BBC1

References

External links

Opportunity Knocks (1964–1968) at BFI
Opportunity Knocks (1968–1978) at BFI
Opportunity Knocks (1990) at BFI

1950s British television series
1960s British television series
1970s British television series
1980s British television series
1956 British television series debuts
1990 British television series endings
BBC Light Programme programmes
BBC television game shows
BBC Television shows
Black-and-white British television shows
English-language television shows
ITV game shows
Lost television shows
Talent shows
Television series by Fremantle (company)
Television series by ITV Studios
British television series revived after cancellation
Television shows produced by ABC Weekend TV
Television shows produced by Associated-Rediffusion
Television shows produced by Thames Television
Television shows shot at BBC Elstree Centre
Television shows shot at Teddington Studios